Shrewsbury Town Council is the town council of Shrewsbury in Shropshire, established in April 2009 as part of structural changes to local government in England that abolished Shrewsbury and Atcham Borough Council and created in its place the unitary Shropshire Council. Shrewsbury was previously unparished, with the Mayor of Shrewsbury and Atcham acting as the town's mayor. Serving a population of over 72,000, Shrewsbury Town Council is the fourth most populous parish council in England.

The town council provides horticultural services and is responsible for parks, sports pitches, recreation grounds, allotments and highway verges. The council also manages provision of the town market, community facilities, bus shelters, street lighting and public toilets.

The town council is made up of 17 wards, elected every four years alongside Shropshire Council elections using first-past-the-post. The wards are mostly coterminous with the Shropshire Council divisions created in 2009.

Mayor of Shrewsbury

Prior to 2009, the Mayor of Shrewsbury and Atcham Borough Council acted as Mayor of Shrewsbury. The Mayor is elected annually for a one-year term alongside the Deputy Mayor. By convention the Deputy Mayor becomes Mayor the following year.

Elections

Shrewsbury Town Council election, 2017 
The third elections to Shrewsbury Town Council were held on 4 May 2017, coinciding with elections to Shropshire Council.

The Conservatives gained Bagley from the Liberal Democrats while the Greens gained Porthill, its first seat on Shrewsbury Town Council, also from the Liberal Democrats. That left Labour with 7 seats, the Conservatives with 6, the Liberal Democrats with 3 and the Green Party with 1.

Summary

All wards are single seat.

Shrewsbury Town Council election, 2013
The second elections to Shrewsbury Town Council were held on 3 May 2013, coinciding with elections to Shropshire Council.

Labour gained Column, Monkmoor and Sundorne from the Conservatives while the Liberal Democrats gained Bagley and Quarry and Coton Hill. The composition of the town council was subsequently 7 for Labour, 5 for the Conservatives and 5 for the Liberal Democrats. With the Conservatives losing overall control, Labour and the Liberal Democrats took control of the control.

Shrewsbury Town Council election, 2009
The first elections to Shrewsbury Town Council were held on 4 June 2009, coinciding with elections to Shropshire Council and the European Parliament.

The Conservatives won 12 seats (4 of which were uncontested), Labour won 3 and the Liberal Democrats won 2.

By-elections

See also
 Shrewsbury
 Shropshire Council
 Local government in England

Notes

References

External links
 Shrewsbury Town Council
 Shropshire Council

Parish councils of England
Local authorities in Shropshire
Town Council